Peter John Pilittere (born November 23, 1981) is an American professional baseball coach for the Colorado Rockies of Major League Baseball (MLB). He was previously the assistant hitting coach for the New York Yankees.

Career
Pilittere graduated from Bishop Amat High School in La Puente, California. He enrolled at California State University, Fullerton to play college baseball for the Cal State Fullerton Titans, where was a member of their 2004 College World Series championship team. The New York Yankees selected Pilittere in the 13th round of the 2004 Major League Baseball draft. He played in the Yankees' organization until 2011, when he retired after playing in 470 games across eight seasons.

In 2012, Pilittere became a coach with the Gulf Coast Yankees. The Yankees promoted him to serve as the hitting coach for the Charleston RiverDogs of the Class A South Atlantic League for the 2013 season, the 2014 season with the Tampa Yankees of the Class A-Advanced, and the 2015 and 2016 seasons with the Trenton Thunder of the Class AA Eastern League. In 2017, he coached for the Scranton/Wilkes-Barre RailRiders of the Class AAA International League.

Prior to the 2018 season, the Yankees named Pilittere their assistant hitting coach at the major league level. The Yankees opted not to retain Pilittere after the 2021 season, and the Colorado Rockies hired him as their assistant hitting coach on December 14, 2021.

Personal life
He is married to Shannon Stein.

References

External links

Yankees coaching bio

1981 births
Living people
People from San Dimas, California
Baseball coaches from California
Baseball players from California
Baseball catchers
Major League Baseball hitting coaches
New York Yankees coaches
Cal State Fullerton Titans baseball players
Staten Island Yankees players
Tampa Yankees players
Peoria Saguaros players
Trenton Thunder players
Scranton/Wilkes-Barre Yankees players
Minor league baseball coaches